Knema conferta is a species of plant in the family Myristicaceae. It is native to Sumatra, Borneo, Peninsular Malaysia, and Singapore.

References

conferta
Flora of Sumatra
Flora of Malaya
Flora of Borneo
Taxonomy articles created by Polbot